The Council of Ministers of Serbia and Montenegro (Savet Ministara Srbije i Crne Gore) was the federal executive governing body of Serbia and Montenegro.

Organization
Chairman of the Council: Svetozar Marović

Secretary general: Igor Jovičić

The Council was composed of 5 ministries. Ministers at the moment of dissolution were:

Minister of Foreign Affairs - Vuk Drašković (Preceded by: Goran Svilanović)
Minister of Defense - Zoran Stanković (Preceded by: Prvoslav Davinić (11 July 2004 - 21 October 2005), Boris Tadić (17 March 2003 – 11 July 2004))
Minister of International Economic Relations - Predrag Ivanović
Minister of Internal Economic Relations - Amir Nurković
Minister of Human and Minority Rights - Rasim Ljajić

Responsibilities
The Council of Ministers duties were to:

Chart and pursue the policy of Serbia and Montenegro in tune with the jointly agreed policy and interests of the member states.
Coordinate the work of the ministries, propose to the parliament the laws and other acts falling within the purview of the ministries.
Appoint and relieve of duty the heads of diplomatic-consular missions of Serbia and Montenegro and other officials in line with the law.
Pass by-laws, decisions and other general enactments for enforcement of the laws of Serbia and Montenegro and to perform other executive duties in accordance with the present constitutional charter.

Terms
Ministers of foreign affairs and defense served two-year terms.
Ministers of International Economic Relations, Internal Economic Relations and Human and Minority Rights served four-year terms.

See also
Politics of Serbia and Montenegro

Government of Serbia and Montenegro